The ARIA Music Award for Best Hip Hop Release, is an award presented at the annual ARIA Music Awards, which recognises "the many achievements of Aussie artists across all music genres", since 1987. It is handed out by the Australian Recording Industry Association (ARIA), an organisation whose aim is "to advance the interests of the Australian record industry." A previous category, Best Urban Release, was split into Best Soul/R&B Release and Best Hip Hop Release, which were first presented in 2019.

To be eligible, the work must be within the hip-hop genre. The nominated release must qualify for inclusion in the ARIA Album Chart, and cannot be entered in any other genre categories. The accolade is voted for by a judging school, which comprises between 40 and 100 members of representatives experienced in this genre, and is given to an artist who is either from Australia or an Australian resident. The award for Best Hip Hop Release was first presented to Sampa the Great for the single, "Final Form".

Winners and nominees
In the following table, the winner is highlighted in a separate colour, and in boldface; the nominees are those that are not highlighted or in boldface.

References

External links
 

H
Hip hop awards